Shu is a district of Jambyl Region in south-eastern Kazakhstan. The administrative center of the district is the auyl of Tole bi.

References

Districts of Kazakhstan
Jambyl Region